A tailings dam is typically an earth-fill embankment dam used to store byproducts of mining operations after separating the ore from the gangue. Tailings can be liquid, solid, or a slurry of fine particles, and are usually highly toxic and potentially radioactive. Solid tailings are often used as part of the structure itself.

Tailings dams rank among the largest engineered structures on earth. It is the largest dam structure on earth by volume, and as of 2001 it was believed to be the largest earth structure in the world by volume of fill.

There are key differences between tailings dams and the more familiar hydroelectric dams. Tailings dams are designed for permanent containment, meaning they are intended to "remain there forever". Copper, gold, uranium and other mining operations produce varied kinds of waste, much of it toxic, which pose varied challenges for long-term containment.

An estimated 3,500 active tailings impoundments stand around the world, although there is no complete inventory, and the total number is disputed. In an average year, it would be expected that between 2 and 5 "major" tailings dam failures would occur, along with 35 "minor" failures. Assuming the 3,500 figure is correct, this failure rate is "more than two orders of magnitude higher than the failure rate of conventional water retention dams". A 2020 assessment of responsible mining practices by the Responsible Mining Foundation, found that companies have made little or no progress in improving the documentation and safety practices of these ponds.

Structure 

Unlike water retention dams, the height of a tailings dam is typically increased (raised) throughout the life of the particular mine. Typically, a base or starter dam is constructed, and as it fills with a mixture of tailings and water, it is raised. Material used to raise the dam can include the tailings (if their properties are suitable), earthfill, or rockfill.

There are three types of dam raises, the upstream, downstream and centerline, named according to the relative position of the new crest of the dam to the previous. The specific design used is dependent upon topography, geology, climate, the type of tailings, and cost. An upstream tailings dam consists of trapezoidal embankments being constructed on top but toe to crest of another, moving the crest further upstream. This creates a relatively flat downstream side and a jagged upstream side which is supported by tailings slurry in the impoundment. The downstream design refers to the successive raising of the embankment that positions the fill and crest further downstream. A centerlined dam has sequential embankment dams constructed directly on top of another while fill is placed on the downstream side for support and slurry supports the upstream side.

List of largest tailings dams 

Type: TE - Earth; ER - Rock-fill; PG - Concrete gravity; CFRD - Concrete face rock fill

Concerns 

The standard of public reporting on tailings dam incidents is poor. A large number remain completely unreported, or lack basic facts when reported. There is no comprehensive database for historic failures. According to mining engineer David M Chambers of the Center for Science in Public Participation, 10,000 years is "a conservative estimate" of how long most tailings dams will need to maintain structural integrity.

Failure rate 

The lack of any comprehensive tailings dam database has prevented meaningful analysis, either gross comparisons (such as country to country comparisons, or tailings dam failures versus hydro dam failure rates) or technical failure analysis to help prevent future incidents. The records are very incomplete on crucial data elements: design height of dam, design footprint, construction type (upstream, downstream, center line), age, design life, construction status, ownership status, capacity, release volume, runout, etc.

An interdisciplinary research report from 2015 recompiled the official global record on tailings dam failures and major incidents and offered a framework for examining the severity and consequence of major incidents. That report shows a correlation between failure rates and the pace of copper ore production, and also establishes a relationship between the pursuit of lower grades of ore, which produces larger volumes of waste, and increasingly severe incidents. For this reason, several programs to make tailing dams more sustainable have been set in motion in countries like Chile, where there are more than 740 spread across the country.

Environmental damage 

The mining and processing byproducts collected in tailings dams are not part of the aerobic ecological systems, and are unstable. They may damage the environment by releasing toxic metals (arsenic and mercury among others), by acid drainage (usually by microbial action on sulfide ores), or by damaging aquatic wildlife that rely on clear water.

Tailings dam failures involving significant ecological damage include:

 the Jagersfontein Tailings Dam Collapse, South Africa in September 2022, was a structural failure of a tailings dam used by a stockpile mineral reprocessor, resulting in a mudslide through the town and surrounding farmland.
 the Brumadinho dam disaster, Brazil, January 25, 2019, where as many as 252 people are unaccounted for, and at least 134 are dead. The disaster released 12 million cubic meters of iron waste leading to the Paraopeba River.
 the Bento Rodrigues dam disaster, Brazil, November 5, 2015, considered the worst environmental disaster in Brazil's history, killed 19 people when an iron ore containment dam failed and released 60 million cubic meters of iron waste.
 the Mount Polley mine, British Columbia, August 4, 2014, which released 10 million cubic metres of water and 4.5 million cubic metres of metals-laden tailings from a holding reservoir.
 the Ok Tedi environmental disaster in New Guinea, which destroyed the fishery of the Ok Tedi River, continuously from 1984 through 2013
 the Sotkamo metals mine, Finland, 4 November 2012, released "hundreds of thousands of cubic metres" of waste water which raised concentrations of uranium, nickel, and zinc in nearby Snow River, each to at least 10 times the harmful level.
 the Ajka alumina plant accident, Hungary, October 4, 2010, which released one million cubic metres of red mud, a waste product of aluminum refining, flooding the village of Kolontár and killing the Marcal River.
 the Baia Mare cyanide spill, Romania, January 30, 2000, called the worst environmental disaster in Europe since the Chernobyl disaster
 The Doñana disaster, southern Spain, 25 April 1998, which released 4 million-5 million cubic metres of acidic tailings containing heavy metals.
 the Merriespruit tailings dam disaster, South Africa occurred on the night of 22 February 1994 when a tailings dam failed and flooded the suburb of Merriespruit, Virginia. Seventeen people were killed as a result.
 the Church Rock uranium mill spill in New Mexico, July 16, 1979, the largest release of radioactive waste in U.S. history 
 three uranium tailings dams near the town of Ak-Tüz, present-day Kyrgyzstan, collapsed in a December 1964 earthquake, releasing 60% of their radioactive volume into the Kichi-Kemin River and its agricultural valley
 an incident on April 7, 1961, released  of uranium mine tailings from operations of the Soviet-era Wismut organization into the Zwickauer Mulde River in the village of Oberrothenbach

Tailings ponds can also be a source of acid drainage, leading to the need for permanent monitoring and treatment of water passing through the tailings dam. For instance in 1994 the operators of the Olympic Dam mine, Western Mining Corporation, admitted that their uranium tailings containment had released of up to 5 million m3 of contaminated water into the subsoil. The cost of mine cleanup has typically been 10 times that of mining industry estimates when acid drainage was involved.

Casualties 
The following table of the deadliest known tailings dam failures is not comprehensive, and the casualty figures are estimates.

Largest failures
The following list focuses on the largest tailings dam failures:

See also 
 Oil sands tailings ponds (Canada)
 Ash pond

References

Further reading 
 A chronology of major tailings dam failures
 Mineral Policy Institute tailings dam failure list

 
Dams by type